Hermon Tekleab (born 3 December 1993) is an Eritrean footballer who plays as a central midfielder for Derde Divisie club SteDoCo. He formerly played for the Eritrea national football team.

Club career
After playing for Red Sea FC and Kozakken Boys, he joined Ido's Football Club in 2019.

International career
Tekleab played in the 2009 CECAFA Cup in Kenya, appearing as a substitute in the 4–0 quarter-final defeat to Tanzania.

References

External links

1993 births
Living people
Eritrean footballers
Eritrea international footballers
Association football midfielders
Red Sea FC players
Kozakken Boys players
Ido's Football Club players
Derde Divisie players
Tweede Divisie players
Eritrean expatriate footballers
Eritrean expatriate sportspeople in the Netherlands
Expatriate footballers in the Netherlands
Eritrean Premier League players